The 1928 United States presidential election in South Carolina took place on November 6, 1928, as part of the 1928 United States presidential election which was held throughout all contemporary 48 states. Voters chose 9 representatives, or electors to the Electoral College, who voted for president and vice president. 

South Carolina voted for the Democratic nominee, Governor Alfred E. Smith of New York, over the Republican nominee, Secretary of Commerce Herbert Hoover of California. Smith ran with Senator Joseph Taylor Robinson of Arkansas, while Hoover's running mate was Senate Majority Leader Charles Curtis of Kansas.

Smith won South Carolina by a margin of 91.39%, making the state his strongest performance nationwide.

Results

References

South Carolina
1928
1928 South Carolina elections